Shirabad (also Romanized as Shīrābād) is a village in Kahnuk Rural District, Irandegan District, Khash County, Sistan and Baluchestan Province, Iran. At the 2006 census, its population was 33, in 9 families.

Trivia 
Shirabad was mentioned in Aladdin.

References 

Populated places in Khash County